The 1955 Colorado State Bears baseball team represented Colorado State College of Education in the 1955 NCAA baseball season. The Bears played their home games at Jackson Field. The team was coached by Pete Butler in his 13th year at Colorado State.

The Bears won the District VII playoff to advance to the College World Series, where they were defeated by the Arizona Wildcats.

Roster

Schedule 

! style="" | Regular Season
|- valign="top" 

|- align="center" bgcolor="#ccffcc"
| 1 || April 1 || at  || Unknown • Golden, Colorado || 11–2 || 1–0 || 1–0
|- align="center" bgcolor="#ccffcc"
| 2 || April 2 || Coloardo Mines || Jackson Field • Greeley, Colorado || 8–0 || 2–0 || 2–0
|- align="center" bgcolor="#ccffcc"
| 3 || April 8 ||  || Jackson Field • Greeley, Colorado || 11–4 || 3–0 || 2–0
|- align="center" bgcolor="#ccffcc"
| 4 || April 9 || at Colorado A&M || Colorado Field • Fort Collins, Colorado || 5–4 || 4–0 || 2–0
|- align="center" bgcolor="#ccffcc"
| 5 || April 15 ||  || Jackson Field • Greeley, Colorado || 9–7 || 5–0 || 3–0
|- align="center" bgcolor="#ccffcc"
| 6 || April 16 || Colorado College || Jackson Field • Greeley, Colorado || 10–0 || 6–0 || 4–0
|- align="center" bgcolor="#ccffcc"
| 7 || April 19 || Warren Air Force Base || Jackson Field • Greeley, Colorado || 7–1 || 7–0 || 4–0
|- align="center" bgcolor="#ccffcc"
| 8 || April 22 || at  || Unknown • Laramie, Wyoming || 15–4 || 8–0 || 4–0
|- align="center" bgcolor="#ccffcc"
| 9 || April 23 || Wyoming || Jackson Field • Greeley, Colorado || 9–7 || 9–0 || 4–0
|- align="center" bgcolor="#ccffcc"
| 10 || April 26 ||  || Jackson Field • Greeley, Colorado || 10–6 || 10–0 || 4–0
|- align="center" bgcolor="#ccffcc"
| 11 || April 29 || at Colorado Mines || Unknown • Golden, Colorado || 13–8 || 11–0 || 5–0
|- align="center" bgcolor="#ccffcc"
| 12 || April 30 || Colorado Mines || Jackson Field • Greeley, Colorado || 5–3 || 12–0 || 6–0
|-

|- align="center" bgcolor="#ccffcc"
| 13 || May 3 || Warren Air Force Base || Jackson Field • Greeley, Colorado || 13–0 || 13–0 || 5–0
|- align="center" bgcolor="#ccffcc"
| 14 || May 6 || at  || Unknown • Gunnison, Colorado || 16–3 || 14–0 || 6–0
|- align="center" bgcolor="#ccffcc"
| 15 || May 7 || at Western State || Unknown • Gunnison, Colorado || 12–2 || 15–0 || 8–0
|- align="center" bgcolor="#ccffcc"
| 16 || May 10 || Fort Carson || Jackson Field • Greeley, Colorado || 7–4 || 16–0 || 8–0
|- align="center" bgcolor="#ccffcc"
| 17 || May 13 || at Colorado College || Stewart Field • Colorado Springs, Colorado || 14–9 || 17–0 || 9–0
|- align="center" bgcolor="#ccffcc"
| 18 || May 14 || at Colorado College || Stewart Field • Colorado Springs, Colorado || 19–4 || 18–0 || 10–0
|- align="center" bgcolor="#ccffcc"
| 19 || May 17 || at Denver || Unknown • Denver, Colorado || 10–5 || 19–0 || 10–0
|- align="center" bgcolor="#ccffcc"
| 20 || May 20 || at Fitzsimons Army Medical Center || Unknown • Aurora, Colorado || 13–0 || 20–0 || 10–0
|- align="center" bgcolor="#ccffcc"
| 21 || May 21 || at Fitzsimons Army Medical Center || Unknown • Aurora, Colorado || 9–0 || 21–0 || 10–0
|- align="center" bgcolor="#ffcccc"
| 22 || May 24 || Warren Air Force Base || Jackson Field • Greeley, Colorado || 2–5 || 21–1 || 10–0
|- align="center" bgcolor="#ccffcc"
| 23 || May 27 || Fort Carson || Jackson Field • Greeley, Colorado || 25–7 || 22–1 || 10–0
|-

|-
|-
! style="" | Postseason
|- valign="top"

|- align="center" bgcolor="#ccffcc"
| 24 || June  || Wyoming || Jackson Field • Greeley, Colorado || 17–6 || 23–1 || 10–0
|- align="center" bgcolor="#ffcccc"
| 25 || June  || Wyoming || Jackson Field • Greeley, Colorado || 7–13 || 23–2 || 10–0
|- align="center" bgcolor="#ccffcc"
| 26 || June  || Wyoming || Jackson Field • Greeley, Colorado || 12–5 || 24–2 || 10–0
|-

|- align="center" bgcolor="#ccffcc"
| 27 || June 10 || vs Southern California || Omaha Municipal Stadium • Omaha, Nebraska || 2–1 || 25–2 || 10–10
|- align="center" bgcolor="#ffcccc"
| 28 || June 11 || vs Wake Forest || Omaha Municipal Stadium • Omaha, Nebraska || 0–10 || 25–3 || 10–0
|- align="center" bgcolor="#ffcccc"
| 29 || June 12 || vs Arizona || Omaha Municipal Stadium • Omaha, Nebraska || 0–20 || 25–4 || 10–0
|-

References 

Northern Colorado Bears baseball seasons
Colorado State Bears baseball
College World Series seasons
Colorado State
Rocky Mountain Athletic Conference baseball champion seasons